Lazzaro Bastiani (1429  – 5 April 1512) was an Italian painter of the Renaissance, active mainly in Venice.

He was born in Padua. He is first recorded as a painter in Venice by 1460 in a payment for an altarpiece of San Samuele, for the Procuratori di San Marco. In 1462 he was paid at the same rate as Giovanni Bellini. In 1470, he was a member of the Scuola di San Girolamo in Venice. In the 1480s he worked with Gentile Bellini for the Scuola Grande di San Marco. He painted a Coronation of the Virgin (Gallerie dell'Accademia); a Nativity (1477); and a St. Anthony on the Nut Tree.

In 1508 he was called upon, with his pupil  Vittore Carpaccio, to estimate paintings of   Giorgione for the Fondaco dei Tedeschi.

References
Grove Encyclopedia of Art entry
Getty museum biography
A Guide to the Paintings of Venice, Karl Karoly, and Frank Tryon Charles, George bell and Sons, London, 1895, page 229.

1429 births
1512 deaths
Painters from Padua
15th-century Italian painters
Italian male painters
16th-century Italian painters
Painters from Venice
Italian Renaissance painters